The Kosmos (also spelled Cosmos,) rockets were a series of Soviet and subsequently Russian rockets, derived from the R-12 and R-14 missiles,  the best known of which is the Kosmos-3M, which has made over 440 launches. The Kosmos family contained a number of rockets, both carrier rockets and sounding rockets, for orbital and sub-orbital spaceflight respectively. The first variant, the Kosmos-2I, first flew on 27 October 1961. Over 700 Kosmos rockets have been launched overall.

Variants

Launches

See also

R-7 family

References

Rocket families
Space launch vehicles of the Soviet Union
Energia rocket engines